The Ming-Kush Botanical Reserve is located in Jumgal District of Naryn Region of Kyrgyzstan. It was established in 1984 with a purpose of conservation of Ammopiptanthus nanus.  The botanical reserve occupies 76.7 hectares.

References

Botanical reserves in Kyrgyzstan
Protected areas established in 1984